= François Gacon =

French poet and translator

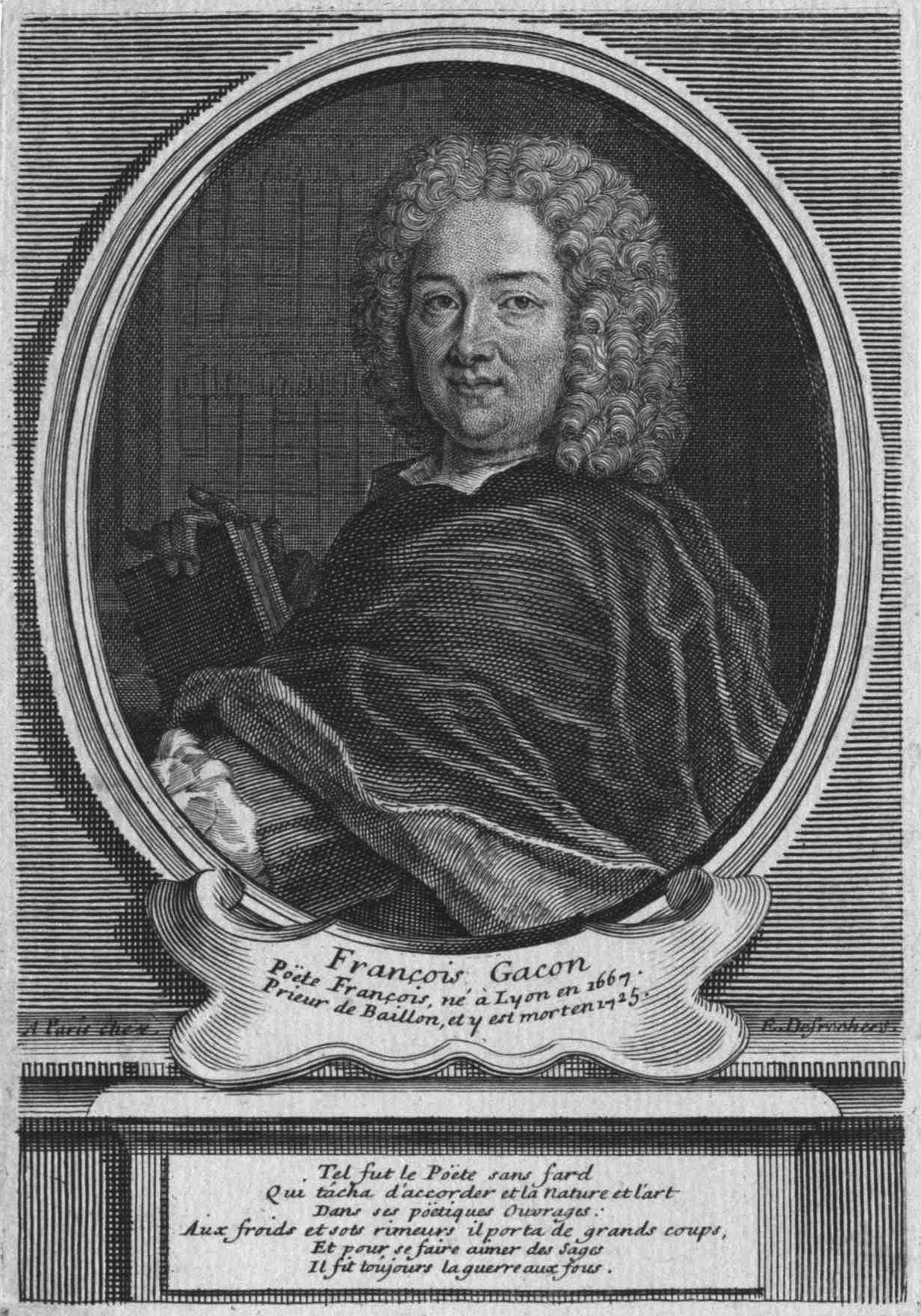
Portrait of François Gacon, etching by Etienne Jehandiers Desrochers

François Gacon (1667–1725) was a French poet and translator.
